Prices Branch is an unincorporated community in Montgomery County, Missouri, United States.

History
A post office called Price's Branch was established in 1855, and remained in operation until 1908. The community took its name from nearby Prices Branch creek.

Notable person
Charles Leiper Grigg, inventor of 7 Up, was born at Prices Branch in 1868.

References

Unincorporated communities in Montgomery County, Missouri
Unincorporated communities in Missouri